Wrocław’s gnomes are small figurines (20-30 cm) that first appeared in the streets of Wrocław, Poland in 2005. Since then, their numbers have been continually growing, and today they are considered a tourist attraction: those who would like to combine sight-seeing in Wrocław with "Hunting for dwarfs" are offered special brochures with a map and mobile application software for smartphones. In April 2019, there were already 600 dwarfs in the city. Six are located outside the city at the LG plant in Biskupice Podgórne.

History 
In 2001, to commemorate the Orange Alternative (Polish anti-communist movement), a monument of a gnome (the movement’s symbol) was officially placed on Świdnicka Street, where the group’s gatherings used to take place. In 2003, the Mayor of Wrocław, in an attempt to continue the new tradition, unveiled a small plaque on the door of The Dwarves’ Museum. It can be found at the height of human knees on the wall of a historic tenement called Jaś, which is situated between the Market Square and St. Elizabeth’s Church.

The figures of the gnomes, which are smaller than the Orange Alternative monument on Świdnicka Street, were placed in different parts of the city. The first five, designed by Tomasz Moczek, a graduate of the Academy of Fine Arts in Wrocław, were placed in August 2005. These were the Fencer near the University of Wrocław, the Butcher in Stare Jatki arcade, two Sisyphuses on Świdnicka Street and the Odra-Washer-Dwarf, near Piaskowy Bridge. The name of the last dwarf is related to Pracze Odrzańskie, an estate on the outskirts of the city. Since that time, the number of figures has continued growing.

A ceremony unveiling two other dwarves took place on the day of June 18, 2008. They were situated on Świdnicka Street, next to W-skers: a dwarf in a wheel chair. The figures represent two disabled dwarves: the Deaf-mute and the Blind. They are part of the Wrocław Without Barriers campaign, which aims at drawing attention to handicapped people living in Wroclaw. Five days later, at the Hematology and Pediatric Oncology Clinic in Wrocław, another dwarf was erected. It was to be the third female dwarf, Marzenka, whose design was based on the logo of the Mam marzenie charity.

The Dwarves' Festival takes place in Wrocław every year in September.

Gallery

References

Wrocław
Figurines
Landscape architecture
Dwarves in popular culture
Tourist attractions in Wrocław
Outdoor sculptures in Poland
2001 introductions
Fictional gnomes